The Rio Cuarto Open or Abierto de Rio Cuarto was a golf tournament on the PGA of Argentina Tour, formerly the principal professional golf tour in Argentina. Founded in 1956, it was always played at the Rio Cuarto Golf Club in Río Cuarto, Córdoba Province. It was last held in 2000.

Winners

*  won following playoff

Golf tournaments in Argentina